Sleeping Queens is a children's card game manufactured by Gamewright. The game was invented by six-year-old Miranda Evarts.

Miranda's family helped her develop the game and find a publisher. Sleeping Queens has received praise, including being chosen by the Canadian Toy Testing Council as one of its "2006 Best Bet Awards" selections.

References

External links
Manufacturer's website for Sleeping Queens.
Review by Tom Vasel.

Card games introduced in 2005
Children's games
Gamewright Games games